Sirak Tesfom (born 10 October 1994) is an Eritrean road racing cyclist, who last rode for UCI Continental team .

Major results

2016
 1st  Time trial, National Junior Road Championships
2017
 5th Fenkil Northern Red Sea Challenge
 6th Asmara Circuit
 10th Overall Tour Eritrea
2018
 Africa Cup
1st Road race
1st Time trial
1st Team time trial
2019
 African Road Championships
1st  Team time trial
2nd  Time trial
 2nd Time trial, National Road Championships
 African Games
2nd  Team time trial
5th Time trial
 5th Overall La Tropicale Amissa Bongo
1st  Mountains classification
 5th Overall Tour du Rwanda

References

External links

1994 births
Living people
Eritrean male cyclists
African Games silver medalists for Eritrea
Sportspeople from Asmara